The Packard Twelve was a range of V12-engined luxury automobiles built by the Packard Motor Car Company in Detroit, Michigan. The car was built from model year 1916 until 1923, then it returned 1933 until 1939. As a sign of changing times, the majority of second generation Packard Twelves received standard bodywork, with custom bodywork gradually losing favor. Many of the custom cars were actually only "semi-customs", with Dietrich assembling Packard-made bodies with special touches.

History 
Packard introduced the Twin Six to stay competitive with Marmon, Pierce-Arrow, Rolls-Royce, Renault and other luxury brands. Cadillac and Lincoln began offering large luxury products starting in the late 1910s.

Large displacement engines provided the horsepower and torque their clients wanted and due to the low quality of gasoline fuel at the time, and low compression ratios, 50 bhp was more than adequate. It is estimated that the rating equivalent of early gasoline available varied from 40 to 60 octane and that the "High-Test", sometimes referred to as "fighting grade", probably averaged 50 to 65 octane.

First Generation

The standard paint scheme for open cars, touring sedans, phaetons, and runabouts was Packard blue with cream yellow striping on body and door panels, with black used on the underbody, radiator, fenders, chassis and running gear with no striping. Wheels were painted cream yellow with black stripes. Closed body choices were painted similar without cream yellow painted wheels. Brightwork was nickel plated, and a Warner speedometer, with a Waltham clock, among other items, were standard equipment. Optionally, the choice of interior and exterior colors were endless to accommodate the customers preferences.

Ten different body styles were available on either wheelbase while coupe and runabout body styles were only offered on the 125" wheelbase. The engine was a 60 degree L-head displacing  producing  at 2600 rpm. Detachable heads and larger radiators came in 1916, a center-mounted gear shifter and brake levers in 1917.

The range consisted of three series, built from May 1915 until June 1923. It was available with a shorter wheelbase from 1915 until May 1919. From 1915 to 1920, the Twin Six was the sole offering from Packard. Production was 30,941 automobiles. Prices started at US$3,050 ($ in  dollars ) to US$5,150 ($ in  dollars ) for the Imperial Limousine. The 1919 Third Series Twin Six 3-25 Runabout was used as the pace car for the 1919 Indianapolis 500 auto race. 

 First series (May, 1915 until August, 1916) 
 Packard Twin Six 1-25; wheelbase 125 in. Engine without detachable cylinder head
 Packard Twin Six 1-35; wheelbase 135 in. Engine without detachable cylinder head

 Second series (August, 1916 until August, 1917) 
 Packard Twin Six 2-25; wheelbase 126½ in. Engine with detachable cylinder head
 Packard Twin Six 2-35; wheelbase 136 in. Engine with detachable cylinder head

 Third series (August, 1917 until June, 1923. 3-25 ends May, 1919) 
 Packard Twin Six 3-25; wheelbase 126½ in. tapered hood, straight body, center shift and brake levers
 Packard Twin Six 3-35; wheelbase 136 in. tapered hood, straight body, center shift and brake levers

Second Generation

For 1933 Packard reintroduced a twelve-cylinder engine, initially called the "Twin Six", then changing the name to "Packard Twelve," to align it with the rest of the Packard lineup. The Twin Six' double drop frame was replaced by a tapered design. Convertibles and roadsters used leftover ninth series bodies with a smaller radiator than the all-new tenth series models.

The Twin Six' V12-engine was retained without major change. The cylinder blocks are at a 67 degree angle, bore and stroke  respectively. The cooling system was improved and a new Bendix-Stromberg EE-3 carburetor with an automatic choke was introduced, increasing power somewhat. A single dry-plate clutch replaced the earlier twin-plate model, matched to a floor-shifted three-speed manual transmission and a new one-piece driveshaft. The existing mechanical brakes were also adopted for the Twelve.

The shorter wheelbase (Model 1005) was available with at least ten different styles of bodywork, ranging from the two-seat Coupe Roadster to the five-seat Formal Sedan. Standard bodyworks for the long wheelbase Model 1006 were Sedan and Sedan Limousine (both either five- or seven-seaters), with a host of custom bodyworks also on offer. These were mainly by Dietrich and LeBaron. The Super Eight long wheelbase chassis was no longer available, restricting custom bodyworks to the new Twelve.

Year-to-year changes 
In 1934 the 11th series model was introduced, adding a shorter third version on the  chassis of the Super Eight. An "Aero Sport Coupe" bodied in-house and a LeBaron-bodied "Runabout Speedster" were available on this wheelbase; only around ten of these two types were made. The appearance of the dramatic, almond-shaped Aero Sport Coupe was guided by Packard stylist Ed Macauley although the actual design work was done by Count Alexis de Sakhnoffsky in his stint as a consultant at Packard. Only four Sport Coupes were built. This was the last car to be "Custom Made by Packard." The Model codes were 1106 (short), 1107 (middle), and 1108 (long). 960 Packard Twelves were built in 1934. This was also the first year that a radio was a factory option.

The gearbox was now fully synchronized and both the mechanical brakes and the clutch received vacuum assist. The 14th Series of 1936 was largely unchanged from the 12th (there was no 13th Series). The only differences were a radiator angled by five more degrees, the oil temperature regulator was redesigned, and the shortest wheelbase model was discontinued.

Model year 1937 brought hydraulic brakes for the 15th Series Twelve; these had already been available for two years on the Packard One Twenty. Suicide doors were changed to conventional, front-hinged ones. With 1300 built, 1937 was the Twelve's most successful year, and Dietrich offered six custom coachwork options.

The shortest Model 1606 used the Super Eight chassis but was not included in Packard's brochures and it is unsure if any were built. Only 566 16th Series Twelves were built, followed by 446 17th Series. The fenders were of a heavier design than on previous years' models, while a column shift became and option alongside the center mounted shifter. This shape remained in use for 1939's 17th Series, the last of the Packard Twelves. 5262 examples were built in total, with the top sedan as the All Weather Cabriolet by Brunn & Company for US$8,510 ($ in  dollars ). For 1940 Packard's top model was the Packard Custom Super Eight.

In October 1935, American President Franklin D. Roosevelt gave Joseph Stalin an armoured Packard Twelve, which became the dictator's favourite automotive vehicle for many years.

References 

 

Twelve
Rear-wheel-drive vehicles
Cars introduced in 1916
Cars introduced in 1933